Omala is a Local Government Area in Kogi State, Nigeria bounded in the north by the Benue River. Its headquarters are in the town of Abejukolo (or Abajikolo) in the north of the area at.

The northeasterly line of equal latitude and longitude passes through the southeast of the LGA. 
 
As of 2016, the population grew to 145,700.

Most locals are predominantly Igala speaking people with a few being Bassa and Agatu from Benue State.

The postal code of the area is 270.

Climate
In town of Abejukolo which is the headquarters of Omala LGA of Kogi state, the rainy season is oppressive and overcast while the dry season is humid and partly cloudy, and it is hot year round. Over the course of the year, the temperature typically varies from 64 °F to 94 °F and is rarely below 58 °F or above 99 °F.

References

Local Government Areas in Kogi State